The Baozhusi Dam is a gravity dam on the Bailong River, located  northwest of Guangyuan in Sichuan Province, China. Construction on the dam began in 1984, the generators were operational between 1996 and 1998 while the rest of the facilities were complete 2000. The dam was constructed for hydroelectric power generation, flood control and water supply for irrigation and industrial uses. On either side of power station at the dam's base, there are two gate-controlled chute spillways. Beside them are two pairs of intermediate sluice-controlled orifice openings. Below the left intermediate opening are two bottom sluices. The dam's power station contains 4 x 175 MW Francis turbine-generators which are afford a maximum hydraulic head of  given the dam's height.

See also

List of dams and reservoirs in China
List of major power stations in Sichuan

References

Dams in China
Hydroelectric power stations in Sichuan
Gravity dams
Dams completed in 2000